The Battle of Bakenlaagte occurred on 30 October 1901 during the guerrilla phase of Anglo-Boer war of 1899–1902. The battle saw the Eastern Transvaal Boer commandos of Generals Grobler, Brits, Viljoen and Louis Botha attack the rear guard of Colonel Benson's much feared No. 3 Flying Column while it was in marching formation to its base camp.

Battle
Lieutenant Colonel George Elliott Benson's British No. 3 flying column, comprising 2000 men, specialised in night raids that were terrorising Boer Commandos on the highveld, it had become so successful that General Botha ordered all available Boer forces to accumulate at Bakenlaagte so as to attack Benson.

The No. 3 Flying Column was marching back to a refit station after performing farm clearing operations. Rainy and misty weather had reduced visibility and made the going difficult which caused the marching British column to become spread out into clusters of troops. The column force became further extended when Benson began to deploy small detachments of mounted men and infantry to suppress small Boer sniping teams that were roaming around the marching column.

General Botha arrived with about 800 reinforcements after riding about  without stopping, on arrival, Botha observed that the strung out column provided an ideal opportunity for an overwhelming force to roll up the isolated and spread out groups of commonwealth troops piecemeal and immediately ordered a large Boer force of mounted men to attack the small isolated rear guard of the column.

Outnumbered four to one, the Columns rear guard of 210 Commonwealth troops set up a defensive position on Gun Hill and fought about 900 Boers in a close quarter twenty minute gun fight that ended only when the column rear guard was annihilated.

Great bravery was demonstrated by the men on both sides with combined casualties numbering approximately 87 killed with 182 wounded. Colonel Benson (a veteran of the Battle of Magersfontein, 11 December 1899) was to die the next morning from wounds received on the field of battle.

This rear-guard action allowed the main column time to deploy and set up a defensive perimeter under Lt Colonel Wools-Sampson. This deployment prevented the attacking Boer forces from riding on and capturing the main column as originally planned. The Boers left the field with what ever spoils they could carry and the British carried in the wounded to the entrenched camp during the night.

The Bakenlaagte battlefield is located on the Kriel-Kinross road at the intersection of the R547 and R580 roads in Mpumalanga Province, just south of Matla Power Station.

The 73 dead Commonwealth troops were buried on Gun Hill but later reinterred in Primrose Cemetery, Corner of Cemetery road and Beaconsfield road, Germiston in the 1960s. Sadly, some of the white granite graves have been vandalised and the brass letters on Colonel Benson's granite grave have been stolen.

References
Bakenlaagte - The Story by Clive Willsworth, 
www.up.ac.za/dspace/bitstream/2263/12638/6/003 p50-99.pdf bakenlaagte

Conflicts in 1901
Battles of the Second Boer War
1901 in South Africa
October 1901 events